Sage Dixon is a Republican Idaho State Representative since 2014 representing District 1 in the B seat.

Education and career
Dixon attended San Jose State University majoring in finance.  He failed out of school. He was an owner of an electrical contracting business, and worked as a superintendent for an electrical contracting firm in Coeur d'Alene, Idaho.

Elections

2016 
After running unopposed in the Republican primary, Dixon defeated Democratic nominee Stephen Howlett with 68.60% of the vote.

Dixon supported Ted Cruz in the 2016 Republican Party presidential primaries.

2014 
Scott defeated incumbent George Eskridge in the May 20, 2014 Republican Primary with 53.5% of the vote.

Scott defeated Andrew C. Sorg in the General Election with 65.5% of the vote.

References

External links
Sage Dixon at the Idaho Legislature
 Sage Dixon at ballotpedia.org

Living people
Idaho Republicans
21st-century American politicians
Year of birth missing (living people)
People from Bonner County, Idaho